The Episcopal Diocese of Spokane is a diocese of the Episcopal Church in eastern Washington and northern Idaho, United States. Its office and cathedral seat are in Spokane, Washington. The current bishop is Gretchen Rehberg, the first woman to lead the Diocese.

The Diocese of Spokane started as a missionary district in the mid-1860s. One of the earliest missionary priests, Lemuel H. Wells, established twenty-three missions in the late 19th century and became the first Bishop of Spokane in 1892.

The early part of the 20th century saw the growth of Christian education programs. This included the establishment of a summer camp for youth on Lake Coeur d'Alene in northern Idaho. Named after Bishop Edward M. Cross, Camp Cross was one of the first camps in the area; it started out as a summer school in 1923 on Lake Chelan before its current property on Lake Coeur d'Alene was donated by Bishop Page. Camp Cross has become a camp and retreat center serving the needs of young and old alike.

By the mid 20th century, the Cathedral of St. John the Evangelist in Spokane was begun and completed. A striking example of American neo-gothic architecture, the Cathedral dominates the southern skyline of Spokane as it sits high upon a hill overlooking downtown.

The late 20th century saw the establishment of a diocesan housing corporation to bring more housing for the elderly throughout the diocese, as well as the expansion and strengthening of local ministries.

The territory of the Diocese of Spokane has thirty-eight congregations and encompasses all of Washington east of the Cascades and the northern Idaho panhandle. Western Washington is within the Diocese of Olympia, and southern Idaho is in the Diocese of Idaho, seated at St. Michael's in Boise.

Bishops
 Lemuel Henry Wells (1892–1913)
 Herman Page (1915–1923)
 Edward Makin Cross (1924–1954)
 Russell Sturgis Hubbard (1954–1967)
 John Wyatt (1967–1978)
 Leigh A. Wallace, Jr. (1979–1990)
 Frank Jeffrey Terry, Jr. (1990–1999)
 James E. Waggoner, Jr. (2000–2017)
 Gretchen Rehberg (2017–Present)

External links

Journal of the Annual Convocation of the Church in the District of Spokane

Spokane
Christianity in Idaho
Protestantism in Idaho
Christianity in Washington (state)
 
Religious organizations established in 1892
Anglican dioceses established in the 19th century
Province 8 of the Episcopal Church (United States)
 

de:Bistum Spokane
it:Diocesi di Spokane